White Sulphur Springs is a city in and the county seat of Meagher County, Montana, United States. The population was 955 at the 2020 census.

The center of population of Montana is located in White Sulphur Springs.

White Sulphur Springs was originally called Brewers Springs, after James Scott Brewer, who laid claim to the thermal springs in 1866. In 1876 the town name changed.

Geography and climate
White Sulphur Springs is located at  (46.546396, -110.902552). The Castle Mountains are east of town.

Demographics

2010 census
At the 2010 census there were 939 people in 433 households, including 255 families, in the city. The racial makeup of the city was 97.2% White, 0.1% African American, 0.3% Native American, 0.4% Asian, 0.2% from other races, and 1.7% from two or more races. Hispanic or Latino of any race were 1.4%.

Of the 433 households 22.2% had children under the age of 18 living with them, 49.4% were married couples living together, 7.9% had a female householder with no husband present, 1.6% had a male householder with no wife present, and 41.1% were non-families. 37.4% of households were one person and 19.6% were one person aged 65 or older. The average household size was 2.13 and the average family size was 2.75.

The median age was 51.2 years. 19% of residents were under the age of 18; 5.1% were between the ages of 18 and 24; 18% were from 25 to 44; 31.4% were from 45 to 64; and 26.3% were 65 or older. The gender makeup of the city was 49.8% male and 50.2% female.

2000 census
At the 2000 census there were 984 people in 443 households, including 265 families, in the city. The population density was 1,069.1 people per square mile (413.0/km). There were 567 housing units at an average density of 616.0 per square mile (238.0/km).  The racial makeup of the city was 96.24% White, 1.42% Native American, 0.20% Asian, 0.10% Pacific Islander, 0.51% from other races, and 1.52% from two or more races. Hispanic or Latino of any race were 1.93%.

Of the 443 households 25.3% had children under the age of 18 living with them, 48.1% were married couples living together, 8.4% had a female householder with no husband present, and 40.0% were non-families. 37.0% of households were one person and 17.8% were one person aged 65 or older. The average household size was 2.16 and the average family size was 2.84.

The age distribution was 22.4% under the age of 18, 6.9% from 18 to 24, 22.5% from 25 to 44, 26.9% from 45 to 64, and 21.3% 65 or older. The median age was 44 years. For every 100 females there were 94.9 males. For every 100 females age 18 and over, there were 92.9 males.

The median household income was $28,229 and the median family income  was $34,342. Males had a median income of $23,403 versus $13,929 for females. The per capita income for the city was $13,836. About 11.6% of families and 13.3% of the population were below the poverty line, including 16.5% of those under age 18 and 11.0% of those age 65 or over.

Infrastructure
U.S. Route 89 passes through town.

White Sulphur Springs Airport is a public use airport located 3 miles south of town.

Education
White Sulphur Springs Schools educate students from kindergarten through 12th grade. White Sulphur Springs High School's team name is the Hornets.

Meagher County City Library serves the area.

Notable people
 Dirk Benedict, actor, is from White Sulphur Springs.
 Sarah Calhoun, entrepreneur, founder of the women's workwear company Red Ants Pants.
 Ivan Doig, novelist, was born in White Sulphur Springs.
 Emmanuel Taylor Gordon, Harlem Renaissance singer and performer, was born, raised, and died in White Sulphur Springs.

See also
 National Register of Historic Places in Meagher County

Notes

External links
 Chamber of commerce

Cities in Meagher County, Montana
County seats in Montana
Cities in Montana